In finance, psychological level, is a price level in technical analysis that significantly affects the price of an underlying security, commodity or a derivative. Typically, the number is something that is "easy to remember," such as a rounded-off number. When a specific security, commodity, or derivative reaches such a price, financial market participants (traders, market makers, brokers, investors, etc.) tend to act on their positions (buy, sell or hold).

Examples
 Dow Jones Industrial Average Index - $14,000.00 - the all-time high psychological thousandth level as of 11/9/2007. Also known as "Dow 14,000"
 Crude Oil (light, sweet) - $100.00/barrel

References 
As used by finance analysts and business reporters:
https://web.archive.org/web/20110606031923/http://www.thestreet.com/_yahoopi/markets/marketfeatures/10260856.html?cm_ven=QUIGO&cm_cat=FREE&cm_ite=NA
https://web.archive.org/web/20071114063411/http://www.tradingmarkets.com/.site/eminis/commentary/guestcommentary/-71686.cfm
http://www.dailyfx.com/story/dailyfx_reports/daily_technicals/Euro_and_Aussie_Topping__1193913286650.html
http://mobile.bloomberg.com/news/2011-12-09/euro-may-test-2001-low-versus-yen-ichimoku-suggests-technical-analysis
http://mobile.bloomberg.com/news/2011-06-30/colombia-peso-volatility-falls-as-traders-bet-on-central-bank-intervention

https://www.cnbc.com/id/45720928/Markets_May_Play_Jilted_Lover_in_Euro_Zone_Drama
http://money.cnn.com/2011/02/01/markets/markets_newyork/index.htm

External links
 Psychological barriers in gold prices? 

Behavioral finance